Sylvester "Molly" McGee (August 26, 1952 – July 18, 1994) was a National Football League (NFL) running back who played one season with the Atlanta Falcons. He was drafted by the Falcons in the 16th round of the 1974 NFL Draft. He played college football at the University of Rhode Island. McGee was also a member of the Charlotte Hornets, Ottawa Rough Riders and Saskatchewan Roughriders.

Early years
McGee played starred in high school football and baseball at North Rockland High School in Thiells, New York. He was a three-time All-County center fielder in baseball and made the Daily News All-Star team his junior year. He was a two-time All-Rockland running back, a Daily News All-Star and second-team All-New York State in football. McGee graduated from North Rockland High School in 1970 and was inducted into the Rockland County Sports Hall of Fame in 1986.

College career
McGee played for the Rhode Island Rams on an athletic scholarship. He was a three-time, first-team All-Yankee Conference running back and a first-team All-East tailback in 1972. He was voted to the University of Rhode Island team of the decade in 1980.

Professional career
McGee was drafted by the Atlanta Falcons in the 16th round of the 1974 NFL Draft. He played in 10 games for the Falcons in 1974. He was released by the Falcons in 1975 after he suffered a shoulder injury. McGee played for the Charlotte Hornets of the World Football League in 1975 before the league folded midseason. He played for the Ottawa Rough Riders of the Canadian Football League from 1975 to 1976, when he was traded to the Saskatchewan Roughriders. He was the CFL’s leading receiver in 1978 with 68 receptions. A serious knee injury during the 1980 season ended McGee's pro career.

References

External links
Just Sports Stats
WFL profile

1952 births
1994 deaths
American football running backs
Canadian football running backs
African-American players of American football
African-American players of Canadian football
Rhode Island Rams football players
Atlanta Falcons players
Charlotte Hornets (WFL) players
Ottawa Rough Riders players
People from Haverstraw, New York
Players of American football from New York (state)
Saskatchewan Roughriders players
Sportspeople from the New York metropolitan area
20th-century African-American sportspeople